Afonya is a Soviet comedy and drama film produced by Mosfilm and first released in 1975. The film became the Soviet box office leader of 1975 with a total of 62.2 million ticket sales. The film was shot on location in Yaroslavl.

Plot summary
Plumber – Afanasy Borshchov (Afonya) (Leonid Kuravlev) and his friend Fedulov (Borislav Brondukov) spend all day and night avoiding work and finding opportunities to drink. Afanasy takes "kickbacks" from clients and is often in trouble with the local committee for his behaviour. Afanasy also often uses foreign or old-fashioned names to introduce himself to strangers to seem more interesting.

Afanasy meets plasterer Kolya (Yevgeny Leonov) in a pub, gets drunk and comes home. When his girlfriend sees the state he's in, she leaves him. The next morning he can't even remember yesterday's drinking companion.

Things continue to go downhill for Afanasy. When student interns from the vocational school are allocated to the plumbers, ZhEK master Vostryakova (Valentina Talyzina) doesn't allocate any to him, fearing that he will not teach them well. Afanasy  begs for trainees and gets two. Having worked with him for one day and having seen his attitude and working methods, the trainees refuse to work with him anymore. When Afanasy returns home, Kolya arrives to live at his place for a while, having been thrown out of his house by his wife.

At a dance Afanasy meets young nurse Katya Snegireva (Yevgeniya Simonova), who knows about him through her brother, who used to play in Afanasy's volleyball team. Afanasy doesn't pay her much attention, because he's more interested in older women and already has his eye on one at the dance. However, a romantic walk with the older woman after the dance is over before it begins – Afanasy is challenged to a fight by a hooligan, who he'd quarreled with at the dance. The hooligan's friends join in, and finish the unequal fight. Katya worries for Afanasy's safety, and calls the police- which will only bring Afanasy to the committee's attention again.

At a regular work call Borshchov meets Helen (Nina Maslova) and falls in love at first sight. He starts finding any excuse to work in her flat - even fooling a tenant, astronomer (Gotlib Roninson), by swapping his new Finnish sink for an old one, so he can install the Finnish sink in Helen's home as a gift. In his dreams Afanasy sees a family idyll with his wife Helen and their perfect children.

Katya Snegireva, head over heels for Afanasy,  keeps engineering new meetings with him, and stops at nothing to attract his attention: "Afanasy!  someone called, I thought it was you...". Afonya is completely oblivious to her feelings.

Meanwhile Afanasy’s run in with the police catches up with him and, for persistent drunkenness, truancy and fighting Afanasy is threatened with being sacked at a meeting of the local committee. In addition, if he doesn't restore the Finnish sink he's definitely going to be fired. Afanasy takes a porcelain sink with flowers to Helen to swap with the Finnish sink, but meets Helen coming home with company. She makes her feelings quite clear: she has her own life among fashionable and wealthy men, and Afanasy is just a plumber.

Afanasy, depressed, goes to a restaurant with Fedulov and tries to escape into drunkenness, but it doesn't help. In his drunken state he goes to Katya Snegireva's home and proposes marriage, and wakes up next to her in the morning. Katya tells him she's due to move to Africa with work and wonders if she should cancel for Afanasy.

Afanasy then decides to go back to his village, to his aunt Frosya (Raisa Kurkina), a simple and modest woman who had brought him up. In the village, he meets his childhood friend Fidget (Savely Kramarov) and, in a joyous moment sends the city a telegram resigning from his job and giving up his apartment. Only then does he learn that Aunt Frosya died two years ago. The village people had sent him a telegram, which he hadn't received because he had moved house and didn't tell them his new address. From his neighbor, Uncle Yegor (Nikolai Grinko) Afanasy learns that Frosya deeply missed him and even wrote letters to herself from his name, posting them in a nearby village, then receiving them and reading them to neighbors, who understood that she really wrote the letters herself, but didn't betray it so as not to hurt Frosya's feelings. Frosya had died sitting in front of the window, waiting for Afanasy.

Afanasy’s depression deepens – he has lost everything and has nowhere to go. He goes to the post office and tries to call Katya Snegireva on her memorable phone number 50-50-2, or as he says himself, "rug-rug or two." The answer comes back - Katya has left. Finally frustrated, he goes to the airport. He does not care where he's going or what will happen to him. Things have gotten so bad that a local policeman has to be convinced Afanasy is the man in his passport photograph, so grim has he gotten since it was taken. Finally, just when Afanasy is heading to the AN-2 aircraft, a familiar girlish voice calls out. It's Katya, suitcase in hand: "Afanasy!, someone called, I thought it was you... "

Cast 
 Leonid Kuravlev - Afanasy Borshchov   (Afonya)
 Yevgeniya Simonova - Katya Snegireva
 Yevgeny Leonov - Kolya
 Savely Kramarov - Razor
 Nina Maslova - Elena (Elena, Helene), Beauty of the 139th flats
 Borislav Brondukov - Fedulov
 Igor Bogolyubov - old Peregar
 Valentina Talyzina - Vostryakova
 Vladimir Basov - Vladimir Ivanovich
 Nikolai Parfenov - Fomin, Boris Petrovich
 Gotlib Roninson - astronomer ("Archimedes")
 Raisa Kurkina - Aunt Frosya
 Nina Ruslanova - Tamara
 Nikolai Grabbe - the chief of housing offices
 Nikolai Grinko - Uncle Yegor
 Gennady Yalovich - the director in the theater
 Radner Muratov - Marat Rakhimov
 Tamara Sovchi - cashierdining
 Yusup Daniyal – cashier dining companion
 Mikhail Vaskov - the policeman at the airport
 Peter Lyubeshkin - Uncle Pavel Shevchenko
 Renee Hobua – not featured in the film, although there is in the credits 
 Alexei Vanin  - Ivan Orlov, Elena's husband
 Capitolina Ilienko - a participant in the meeting of housing the office
 Aleksandr Potapov - employee of housing offices
 Mikhail Svetin - the driver Voronkov
 Tatiana Rasputina - a dance partner Afonyia
 Alexander Novikov - a bully with a beard

References

External links

1975 films
1975 comedy films
Soviet comedy films
Russian comedy films
1970s Russian-language films
Films about alcoholism
Films set in the 1970s
Films set in Russia
Films set in the Soviet Union
Films shot in Moscow
Films shot in Yaroslavl Oblast
Films directed by Georgiy Daneliya
Mosfilm films